The House of Tomorrow EP is the third major release by The Magnetic Fields, and the first with Stephin Merritt as the main vocalist. Merge Records reissued it in 1996. The EP's five songs are built on both musical and vocal repetition, so much so that the sleeve reads "five loop songs" as a pun on "five love songs".

Track listing

Personnel
Stephin Merritt - guitar and vocals
Claudia Gonson - drums and vocals
Sam Davol - cello

Additional personnel
Phylene Amuso – bass guitar
Nell Beram - guitar

References

1992 debut EPs
The Magnetic Fields albums
Merge Records EPs